Cabalodontia cretacea is a species of fungus belonging to the family Meruliaceae.

It is native to Europe and Northern America.

References

Meruliaceae